See Theodoropolis for namesakes

Theodoropolis (in Europa) was an Ancient city and former bishopric, remaining a Latin Catholic titular see, also succeeded by a Greek Catholic titular bishopric under the name Theodorium.

Its presumed location is Badoma, in modern European Turkey.

History 
Theodoropolis was important enough in the late Roman province of Europa to become a suffragan of its capital (Heraclea in Europa, ?later Perinthus)'s Metropolitan Archbishop, yet would fade.

Titular successor see 

In 1925, the diocese was nominally restored as a Roman Catholic titular bishop as the latin, Theodorium, when George Calavassy was made Greek Catholic Apostolic Exarch of Constantinople and titular bishop of Theodorium. When he was made 
Greek Catholic Apostolic Exarch of Greece in 1933, he remained the titular bishop of Theodorium, until his death in 1957.

References

External links 
 GCatholic Latin titular see, with titular incumbent biography links
 GCatholic Greek Catholic titular see Theodorium, with titular incumbent biography links

Catholic titular sees in Europe